The  is an Independent Administrative Institution that administers the National Center Test for University Admissions and law school entrance exams in Japan.

The institution is under the control of the Ministry of Education, Culture, Sports, Science and Technology. Its offices are located in Komaba, Meguro, Tokyo.

History 
 1977 Established as the preparation organization for the Common first-stage exam
 1979 First common first-stage exam
 1988 Started providing information on universities through the videotex with its Heart System (ハートシステム)
 1990 Became the administrator of the National Center Test for University Admissions
 2003 Began administering law school entrance exams

See also
 Independent Administrative Institution (IAI), 2001
 List of Independent Administrative Institutions (Japan)

External links 
 Daigaku Nyushi Center website
 Heart System website

Testing and exams in Japan
Independent Administrative Institutions of Japan
1977 establishments in Japan
Government agencies established in 1977